The 2nd Nagaland Olympic & Paralympic Games was a multi-sport event held from 22 to 27 August 2022 in Kohima. The participating delegations included 16 delegations from all districts under Nagaland. A total of 3,500 athletes from the 16 Districts of Nagaland competed in 11 sports and disciplines.

The Games were co-hosted by Dimapur and Longleng. Kohima led the final medal tally, followed by Phek in second place, and Dimapur in third place.

Sports 
There were a total of 11 sports at the 2nd Nagaland Olympic & Paralympic Games.

Medal table

References 

August 2022 events
2022 in multi-sport events
2022 in Nagaland